Peter Petrán (born 18 April 1981) is a Slovak football defender who currently plays for MŠK Rimavská Sobota. 

He had previously played for many seasons with FK Inter Bratislava, except between 2008 and 2010 when he was with NK Primorje. With Primorje he played the 2008-09 season in the Slovenian First League having played 15 league matches, scoring once, but at the end of that season the club was relegated so he played the 2009-10 season in the Slovenian Second League.

References

External links
 Peter Petrán at FK Senica official site. 

1981 births
Living people
Slovak footballers
Association football defenders
FK Inter Bratislava players
NK Primorje players
FK Senica players
Slovak Super Liga players
Expatriate footballers in Slovenia
Expatriate footballers in Poland
MŠK Novohrad Lučenec players
Sandecja Nowy Sącz players
MŠK Rimavská Sobota players